Phaeogramma is a genus of tephritid  or fruit flies in the family Tephritidae.

Species
Phaeogramma hispida Hardy, 1980
Phaeogramma vittipennis Grimshaw, 1901

References

Tephritinae
Tephritidae genera
Diptera of Asia